Please Clap Your Hands is the second EP by American indie pop duo The Bird and the Bee, released on September 25, 2007 by Blue Note Records. It contains four original tracks and a cover of The Bee Gees' 1977 song "How Deep Is Your Love", which features backing vocals from Australian singer Sia.

In addition to the regular duo, the EP contains other instrumental contributions from members of their touring band, including drummer Joey Waronker, guitarist Gus Seyffert, and backing vocalists Megan Geer-Alsop, Willow Geer-Alsop, Alex Lilly, and the aforementioned Sia.

Track listing

Personnel
Credits for Please Clap Your Hands adapted from liner notes.

The Bird and the Bee
 Greg Kurstin – engineer, mixing, producer
 Inara George – vocals

Additional personnel
 Michael Dahan – cover photography
 Megan Geer-Alsop – backing vocals (1)
 Willow Geer-Alsop – backing vocals (1)
 Gordon H. Jee – creative director
 Carla Leighton – design
 Alex Lilly – backing vocals (1)
 Gus Seyffert – guitar (1)
 Sia – backing vocals (5)
 Joey Waronker – drums (1, 2)

See also
 Jeb Bush

References

2007 EPs
Albums produced by Greg Kurstin
The Bird and the Bee albums
Blue Note Records EPs